Opus sectile is a form of pietra dura popularized in the ancient and medieval Roman world where materials were cut and inlaid into walls and floors to make a picture or pattern. Common materials were marble, mother of pearl, and glass. The materials were cut in thin pieces, polished, then trimmed further according to a chosen pattern. Unlike tessellated mosaic techniques, where the placement of very small uniformly sized pieces forms a picture, opus sectile pieces are much larger and can be shaped to define large parts of the design.

The term opus sectile was introduced in recent centuries, but the Romans used the term sectilia pavimenta.

Origin and evolution

Early examples

Early examples have been found from Egypt and Asia Minor.

The Herodian Temple in Jerusalem was built during the second half of the 1st century BC and the first half of the 1st century AD. 

It spread to Rome in the first decades of the 1st c. BC when “stone slab floors came into use, at least in the smaller element type”. Under Augustus, its use in the flooring of public buildings began.
The success of the first experiments on a monumental scale led to its application in the private sector, where decorative schemes with smaller marble sections were perfected but which were very expensive due to the more complex execution. Hence these first examples are limited to imperial properties, such as the villa of Livia at Prima Porta and those of Tiberius on [Villa Jovis|Capri].

Recent work by the Temple Mount Sifting Project has recovered enough pieces of polished stone triangles and squares from the Herodian Temple Mount to reconstruct geometric patterns of opus sectile flooring. Evidence for geometric opus sectile floors also comes from Herodian palaces at Cypros, Caesarea Maritima, Herodium, Jericho, Machaerus, Masada, and from Herodian construction at Banias, where the opus sectile consisted of octagons, squares, and triangles.

Golden era: Rome and Eastern Empire

The most prominent artefacts remain from 4th-century Rome. A large set from the Basilica of Junius Bassus survived, depicting an elaborate chariot and other images. The popularity of opus sectile decoration continued in Rome through the 6th century, and affected areas as far as Constantinople (now Istanbul in Turkey). Particularly remarkable are a series of fourth-century CE panels in glass opus sectile, found in a possible sanctuary of Isis at the eastern Corinthian port of Kenchreai, in excavations carried out in the 1960s; they include scenes of famous authors like Homer and Plato, scenes of Nilotic landscapes, harbour-front cities and geometric panels.

Examples

Later uses

Byzantine Empire
Although the technique died in Rome with the decline of the Empire, it continued to be used prominently in Byzantine churches, primarily in floor designs.

Medieval Italy

From Byzantium it was eventually brought back to Sicily and the Italian mainland, in the 12th century as the Cosmatesque style, concentrating on geometric patterns.

It is featured at the basilica San Miniato al Monte that overlooks Florence.

Italian Renaissance
There was a major revival from the Italian Renaissance (14th–17th century) in the form of pietra dura work, although this normally consists of much smaller compositions and it was used on furniture, mainly.

Intarsia
Architectural work from later periods tends to be called intarsia.

19th-century England
In England, the technique was revived in the late 19th century by artists working in the Arts and Crafts movement. Charles Hardgrave, whose designs were executed by James Powell & Sons at the Whitefriars Glass Works, was a noted designer in this technique.

See also

Intarsia
Marquetry

Pietra dura

Bibliography 
 Avraham, A.: 'Addressing the Issue of Temple Mount Pavements During the Herodian Period'. New Studies on Jerusalem, Vol 13, Ramat-Gan, Israel. 2007.
 Becatti, G. Edificio con opus sectile fuori Porta Marina. Roma: Istituto Poligrafico dello Stato, 1969.
 De Fazio, A & Schöps, A.: Un lacerto in 'opus sectile' dalla 'domus' di via D'Azeglio a Ravenna: proposte di restauro e conservazione. Ravenna: Longo, 1995.
 Ibrahim, L., Scranton, R. & Brill, R. Kenchreai, Eastern port of Corinth ... 2, The panels of opus sectile in glass. Leiden: Brill, 1976.
 Snyder, F. & Avraham. A.: The Opus Sectile Floor in Caldarium of the Palatial Fortress at Cypros. In: Hasmonean and Herodian Palaces at Jericho, Volume V. The Hebrew University of Jerusalem, pp 175–202. 2013.
 The Stations of the Cross according to St. Alphonsus; reproduced from the original “opus sectile” panels in the Church of St Mary's, Lowe House, St Helens, Lancs. London: Burns Oates, 1934.

References

 

Artistic techniques
Ancient Roman art
Hardstone carving
Roman mosaics